Choe Son-hui (born 10 August 1964) is the Minister of Foreign Affairs of North Korea. Previously the First Vice Minister of Foreign Affairs, she was appointed Minister on 11 June 2022, becoming the first woman to hold the position and is one of few North Korean women holding a high-level office.

Choe is a seasoned interpreter, aide, researcher, and Foreign Ministry official. Fluent in English, she interpreted at the six-party talks and Washington-Pyongyang dialogue early in her career. Choe has progressed through the ranks in the foreign ministry, from section chief, to deputy director, and since 2016 deputy director-general of the North American department. She was made a regular vice minister in 2018 with a North American portfolio. She became the first vice minister the following year.

Choe is reportedly a regular participant in track 1.5 and track 2 diplomacy and has experience particularly in the area of North Korea–United States relations and nuclear issues. A statement by Choe released before the 2018 North Korea–United States Singapore Summit between Donald Trump and Kim Jong-un led to President Trump temporarily canceling the meeting. Choe had referred to US Vice President Mike Pence as a "political dummy", angering Trump. Regardless, Choe was a participant in the summit when it took place on 12 June. At the 2019 North Korea–United States Hanoi Summit, Choe made a last-minute attempt to reach an agreement with her American counterparts, but failed to reach a deal.

Early life
Choe Son-hui was born on 10 August 1964 in North Korea. She is the stepdaughter of Choe Yong-rim, a former Premier of North Korea who fought under Kim Il-sung during the anti-Japanese struggle. Through her stepfather, Choe has a close connection with the ruling Kim dynasty of North Korea. She was educated in North Korea, China, Austria, and Malta and is fluent in English.

Career
Choe Son-hui is a senior diplomat, with more than a decade of experience in the Ministry of Foreign Affairs. She is much experienced in negotiating on the nuclear program of North Korea, and negotiating with the United States. She worked as an interpreter and aide in nuclear talks, particularly under First Vice Minister of Foreign Affairs Kim Kye-gwan. Choe participated in such talks in the 1990s and until the six-party talks were foiled in 2009, and onward to 2010 Washington-Pyongyang dialogue. She also served in this capacity during former US president Bill Clinton's visit to Pyongyang following the 2009 imprisonment of American journalists by North Korea and a similar visit by Jimmy Carter. Choe has also interpreted for North Korea's leader Kim Jong-un, including during the 2013 visit by Dennis Rodman, which she reportedly opposed, and for Kim's uncle Jang Song-thaek. She was vice negotiator for 2011 talks with the US. She has also worked as a researcher in the Ministry of Foreign Affairs. She regularly participates in track 1.5 and track 2 diplomacy.

Choe's longstanding position is that the nuclear weapons program of North Korea is the only reliable safeguard of the country's sovereignty. She has said that severing of United States' military alliance with Japan and South Korea are prerequisites for negotiations and that US withdrawal from Korea should be a verifiable process.

Choe has served as section chief, deputy director, and, since 2016, deputy director-general of the North American department of the Ministry of Foreign Affairs. She was also deputy director of the Institute for American Studies (IFAS) under the ministry. In June 2016, Choe became director of the department and director of IFAS. She was elected to the 14th Supreme People's Assembly in 2019, representing the 484th Electoral District (Onjong).

Vice Minister of Foreign Affairs

Choe was promoted to the rank of Vice Minister of Foreign Affairs in late February 2018, replacing Han Song-ryol and taking his North America portfolio. Han remained vice minister with a European portfolio. At the time, there were seven regular vice ministers in the ministry under First Vice Minister Kim Kye-gwan. Called North Korea's "point person" on relations with the United States, Choe's portfolio included responsibility for those relations and with Canada.

Choe's appointment had been interpreted as reflecting North Korea's willingness to negotiate with the United States as she had allegedly expressed a conciliatory position during the initial 2017 North Korea crisis. She was therefore expected to play a role in upcoming negotiations in the run-up to the 2018 North Korea–United States Singapore Summit. In the run-up, she headed North Korea's negotiating team a number of times when they met with their American counterparts. In May, she participated in track 1.5 talks with former US diplomats, in order to get to know the administration of US president Donald Trump.

On 24 May, however, the state news agency KCNA released a statement in Choe's name whereby she criticized US Vice President Mike Pence, calling him a "political dummy" for comparing North Korea to Libya and its nuclear weapons program:

Choe is thought to have direct access to Kim Jong-un, and according to The Times Daniel Hurst, "it is unlikely that she was speaking without the authority of Mr Kim". Choe's remarks directly led to Trump promptly notifying North Korea that the planned 2018 North Korea–United States Singapore Summit would be canceled. According to CNN, "Trump and his aides were infuriated by the statement and wanted to respond forcefully ... The specific and personal targeting of Pence is what irked US officials".

In the end, the summit was organized on 12 June and Choe was present. She was replaced as the head of working-level negotiations in early 2019. At the 2019 North Korea–United States Hanoi Summit that ended prematurely and without an agreement, Choe was the last person to have talked to the American team of negotiators. She made a last-minute suggestion that all facilities of the Yongbyon Nuclear Scientific Research Center could be demolished. When she was then asked to clarify what the offer meant, she was unable to give any further details, resulting in the American team walking out.

First Vice Minister of Foreign Affairs
Choe received a series of promotions in April 2019, becoming a member of the Central Committee of the Workers' Party of Korea and the State Affairs Commission (SAC). She was also elevated to first First Vice Minister of Foreign Affairs, likely replacing her former superior Kim Kye-gwan, who had not been seen in public since 2017. The promotion to SAC in particular has been interpreted as making Choe a very powerful foreign policy official and possibly signaling new impetus to talks between North Korea and the United States. Choe reports directly to Minister of Foreign Affairs Ri Yong-ho.

Choe is the highest-ranking woman in the foreign ministry. She is one of a few women in holding such a high-level office in North Korean politics overall. With her appointment to First Vice Minister of Foreign Affairs, Choe became the highest-ranking female diplomat ever in the history of the country. Ralph Cossa, president of the Center for Strategic and International Studies's Pacific Forum, calls her "incredibly bright and apparently well-connected". Thae Yong-ho, top diplomat who defected in 2016 says: "Her credentials are excellent."

See also

 Foreign relations of North Korea
 Kim Kyong-hui
 Kim Sol-song
 Kim Song-hye
 Kim Yo-jong
 Ro Song-sil
 Women in North Korea

References

Citations

Sources

External links

 Choe's statement on KCNA that lead to the cancellation of the 2018 North Korea–United States summit 

Living people
1964 births
North Korean diplomats
People from Pyongyang
Female foreign ministers
Members of the Supreme People's Assembly
Alternate members of the 8th Central Committee of the Workers' Party of Korea
21st-century North Korean women politicians
21st-century North Korean politicians
Foreign ministers of North Korea
Women government ministers of North Korea